A three-point field goal (also known as a "three-pointer" or "3-pointer") is a field goal in a basketball game, made from beyond the three-point line, a designated arc radiating from the basket. A successful attempt is worth three points, in contrast to the two points awarded for shots made inside the three-point line. The National Collegiate Athletic Association (NCAA) keeps records of the Division I 3-point field made in a game leaders. The statistic was first recognized in the 1986–87 season when 3-point field goals were officially instituted by the NCAA.

Through December 18, 2019, only 19 players have made at least 12 three-point field goals in a single game. The all-time record is 15, which had only occurred one time between 1986–87 and 2017–18, by Marshall's Keith Veney. On December 14, 1996, he set the record against Morehead State. Then, within a two-night span in November 2018, two other players tied Veney's record. On November 14, Robert Morris' Josh Williams made 15, and then on November 15 Furman's Jordan Lyons matched it. Veney remains the only player to have made 15 threes against Division I opposition; Robert Morris' opponent of Mount Aloysius was in NCAA Division III, and Furman's opponent of North Greenville was Division II (both schools remain at those respective levels today). Only three other players have made 14 three-pointers: Ronald Blackshear, Dave Jamerson and Askia Jones. Blackshear and Jones did so against Division I opponents, while Jamerson's performance was against a Division II opponent.

Key

Dates of 12+ three-pointers

References
General

Specific

NCAA Division I men's basketball statistical leaders